Lake Opeka is a small,  lake in Des Plaines, Illinois.

On the shores of Lake Opeka, Lake Park is a  park which offers a wide variety of outdoor recreational opportunities for all age groups, administered by the Des Plaines Park District, with an 18-hole par-3 golf course.

On the northern bank is Good Shepherd Lutheran Church. Jogging paths run around the east side, where a band shelter is located amongst picnic tables and grills, exercise stations and a playground. The southern end has a volleyball sand pit. Rumor has it that there is a jeep underwater along with an old road.

Fishing is allowed. Bass, bluegill and occasional northern pike are caught. There are small sailboats and paddleboats using the lake. Many ducks are on the water, some large carp and occasional turtles.

460 man-hours were spent removing submerged and surface vegetation from the lake, to prevent its becoming a threat to aquatic life (due to its using up the oxygen supply when decomposing). The vegetation consisted of the native slender naiad (Najas flexilis), and an excessive amount of filamentous algae.

References

External links
 Lake Park at Des Plaines Park District
 Lake Park Golf Course
 additional information

Opeka
Des Plaines, Illinois
Bodies of water of Cook County, Illinois